The 1973 French Grand Prix was a Formula One motor race held at the Paul Ricard Circuit on July 1, 1973. It was race 8 of 15 in both the 1973 World Championship of Drivers and the 1973 International Cup for Formula One Manufacturers. It was the first victory for two-time World Championship runner-up Ronnie Peterson.

Qualifying

Qualifying classification

Race

Controversy 
This race was notable for a collision involving Jody Scheckter and Emerson Fittipaldi. Scheckter, who was given an opportunity to drive a factory McLaren for this event was leading from the start in just his third Formula One race. On lap 41, Fittipaldi had closed and attempted to pass the South African, but Scheckter closed the door and they made heavy contact, forcing Emerson into retirement. Scheckter continued but retired shortly afterwards with suspension damage. Fittipaldi ran to the McLaren pits, eventually resulting in fierce words between the two drivers. Scheckter claimed years later that Fittipaldi had called him a 'young hooligan' for his role in the incident. Many drivers wanted him banned from the sport, but McLaren instead decided to put him on the sidelines for a number of races.

Results
Meanwhile, after so many promising races turned to nothing, Swedish driver Ronnie Peterson finally celebrated victory for the first time in his career, driving a Lotus. Tyrrell driver François Cevert finished in second place, whilst Carlos Reutemann finished in third place, driving a Brabham, followed by Jackie Stewart's Tyrrell in fourth, Jacky Ickx fifth for Ferrari, and James Hunt scoring his first point of his F1 career driving a Hesketh-owned March.

Classification

Championship standings after the race

Drivers' Championship standings

Constructors' Championship standings

Note: Only the top five positions are included for both sets of standings. Only the best 7 results from the first 8 races and the best 6 results from the last 7 races counted towards the Championship. Numbers without parentheses are Championship points; numbers in parentheses are total points scored.

References

French Grand Prix
French Grand Prix
1973 in French motorsport